Paul Otis Gibbs III (b. Feb 1966) is an American alt-country singer-songwriter and podcaster who has independently released several albums since 2002.

Biography 
Gibbs was raised in Wanamaker, Indiana, a neighborhood on the outskirts of Indianapolis. He recalls being introduced to the music industry at an early age, when a friend of his aunt's that was supposed to be babysitting him would take him to a nearby saloon to earn money by singing while he played the piano.

Gibbs worked for over 10 years as a tree planter in Indiana, planting what he estimates to be over 7,000 trees.

Music career 

Gibbs' songs feature stories about every day life. He has been compared to Woody Guthrie, Tom T. Hall, Kris Kristofferson, and Townes Van Zandt.

His 2014 album, Souvenirs of a Misspent Youth was described as "his most pleasing, direct and artful work" by The Tennessean. Alan Harrison of No Depression notes that "The Darker Side of Me" is the type of song that Johnny Cash would be interested in recording.

Billy Bragg included Gibbs' song "The Peoples Day" in a list of "Top Five Songs with Something to Say", published in the Wall Street Journal. Andy Gill of The Independent wrote that there is a "authenticity and dedication in Gibbs' delivery which is somehow cleansing in its purity".

Other activities 
Gibbs has recorded more than 100 podcasts under the title "Thanks for Giving a Damn" that consist of conversational interviews with musicians. Podcasts have included conversations with Mando Saenz, Ramsay Midwood, Chris Shiflett (Foo Fighters), Marshall Crenshaw, Jim White, Delbert McClinton, and Amy Lashley. The podcast has been featured on iTunes' "New And Noteworthy" and "What's Hot" lists.

Personal life 
Gibbs lives in Indianapolis, Indiana with his long-time partner Amy Lashley, a singer-songwriter and children's book author.

Discography

References

External links 
 
 
 : "Thanks For Giving A Damn with Otis Gibbs" podcast interview show
 YouTube channel

American alternative country singers
Living people
Musicians from Indianapolis
Musicians from Nashville, Tennessee
American country singer-songwriters
Country musicians from Indiana
Country musicians from Tennessee
Industrial Workers of the World members
Singer-songwriters from Tennessee
1966 births
Singer-songwriters from Indiana